is one of the 16 wards of the city of Nagoya in Aichi Prefecture, Japan. As of 1 October 2019, the ward has an estimated population of 220,782 and a population density of 6,895 persons per km². The total area is 32.02 km².

References 

Wards of Nagoya